Diana Martín (born 1 April 1981 in Madrid) is a Spanish athlete. She competed in the 3000 metres steeplechase at the 2012 Summer Olympics, placing 21st with a time of 9:35.77, a personal best. She competed at the 2016 Summer Olympics.

Competition record

References

1981 births
Living people
Spanish female steeplechase runners
Olympic athletes of Spain
Athletes (track and field) at the 2012 Summer Olympics
Athletes (track and field) at the 2016 Summer Olympics
Athletes from Madrid
European Athletics Championships medalists
Competitors at the 2007 Summer Universiade